Renge-ji is a Shingon sect Buddhist temple in Sanda City, Hyogo, Japan.

Objects of Worship
Amitabha Buddha (Prefecture designated Important Cultural Property).

History
According to the Sanda City website, Renge-ji dates to around 1300.

Cultural Properties
The two storied pagoda is designated a cultural asset by Hyogo prefecture. The original plan of the pagoda, at one tenth scale, is still preserved at the temple. A document found inside the building dates the current structure to 1812 CE.

See also 
 For an explanation of terms concerning Japanese Buddhism, Japanese Buddhist art, and Japanese Buddhist temple architecture, see the Glossary of Japanese Buddhism.

Access

References

External links
Renge-ji Homepage (Japanese)

Buddhist temples in Hyōgo Prefecture